Graphium auriger is a butterfly in the family Papilionidae. It is found in Senegal, Cameroon, Equatorial Guinea, Gabon, the Republic of the Congo, the Central African Republic and the Democratic Republic of the Congo.

Taxonomy
Graphium auriger belongs to a species group with 16 members. All are very similar
The species group members are:
Graphium abri Smith & Vane-Wright, 2001 
Graphium adamastor  (Boisduval, 1836) 
Graphium agamedes (Westwood, 1842)
Graphium almansor (Honrath, 1884)
Graphium auriger (Butler, 1876) 
Graphium aurivilliusi (Seeldrayers, 1896)
Graphium fulleri  (Grose-Smith, 1883)
Graphium hachei (Dewitz, 1881)
Graphium kigoma Carcasson, 1964
Graphium olbrechtsi Berger, 1950
Graphium poggianus (Honrath, 1884)
Graphium rileyi Berger, 1950
Graphium schubotzi (Schultze, 1913)
Graphium simoni (Aurivillius, 1899),
Graphium ucalegon  (Hewitson, 1865)[
Graphium ucalegonides (Staudinger, 1884)

References

auriger
Butterflies described in 1876
Butterflies of Africa
Taxa named by Arthur Gardiner Butler